In 1962 the British Lions rugby union team toured Southern and Eastern Africa. Overall the tourists played twenty-five matches, winning sixteen, losing five and drawing four.

The Lions were unsuccessful in the test series against , losing by three matches to nil with one match drawn. The first three tests were close; the first match was drawn 3–3 and South Africa won the second 3–0 and the third 8–3. The fourth test resulted in a bigger win for South Africa, 34–14.

The tour included games against Rhodesia (which would become Zimbabwe), South West Africa (future Namibia, then part of South Africa) and East Africa in Kenya; winning all three.  The Lions won all their non-international matches except for those against Northern Transvaal and Eastern Transvaal.

The touring party was captained by Arthur Smith. The manager was Brian Vaughan and the assistant manager was Harry McKibbin.

Squad

Management
 Manager D. B. Vaughan
 Coach H. R. McKibbin

Backs
 Dewi Bebb (Swansea and )
 Niall Brophy (University College Dublin and )
 H. J. C Brown (Blackheath and RAF)
 J. M. Dee (Hartlepool Rovers and )
 Ronnie Cowan (Selkirk and )
 David Hewitt (Queen's University RFC and )
 Raymond Hunter (CIYMS and )
 Dickie Jeeps (Northampton and )
 Ken Jones (Llanelli and )
 Tom Kiernan (University College Cork R.F.C. and )
 Tony O'Connor (Aberavon and )
 Richard Sharp (Oxford University and )
 Arthur Smith (Edinburgh Wanderers and )
 Gordon Waddell (London Scottish and )
 Mike Weston (Durham City and )
 John Willcox (Oxford University and )

Forwards
 Mike Campbell-Lamerton (London Scottish, Army and )
 Glyn Davidge (Newport and )
 John Douglas (Stewart's College FP and )
 H. O. Godwin (Coventry and )
 Stan Hodgson (Durham City and )
 Kingsley Jones (Cardiff and )
 Willie John McBride (Ballymena and )
 Bryn Meredith (Newport and )
 Syd Millar (Ballymena and )
 Haydn Morgan (Abertillery and )
 Bill Mulcahy (Bohemians and )
 David Nash (Ebbw Vale and )
 Alun Pask (Abertillery and )
 Budge Rogers (Bedford and )
 David Rollo (Howe of Fife and )
 Keith Rowlands (Cardiff and )
 T. P. Wright (Blackheath and )

Results
Scores and results list British Lions' points tally first.

References
 

British Lions tour
British & Irish Lions tours of South Africa
Rugby union tours of Kenya
Rugby union tours of Namibia
Rugby union tours of Zimbabwe
1961–62 in English rugby union
1961–62 in Scottish rugby union
1961–62 in Welsh rugby union
1961–62 in Irish rugby union
1962 in South African rugby union